Isodon lophanthoides is a species of plant in the family Lamiaceae native from the Indian subcontinent to China.

Infraspecies
, there are two accepted varieties of this species. 
Isodon lophanthoides var. graciliflorus (Benth.) H.Hara
Isodon lophanthoides var. lophanthoides

References

Lamiaceae
Flora of Bhutan